The 1996 Trophée Lalique was the third event of six in the 1996–97 ISU Champions Series, a senior-level international invitational competition series. It was held at the Palais omnisports de Paris-Bercy in Paris on November 15–17. Medals were awarded in the disciplines of men's singles, ladies' singles, pair skating, and ice dancing. Skaters earned points toward qualifying for the 1996–97 Champions Series Final. The compulsory dance was the Golden Waltz and the original dance was the Tango.

Results

Men

Ladies

Pairs

Ice dancing

External links
 1996 Trophée Lalique

Trophée Lalique, 1996
Internationaux de France
Trophée Éric Bompard
Figure
International figure skating competitions hosted by France